Steve Allin (born 1955) is an author, teacher and pioneer in the use of hemp in construction and director of the International Hemp Building Association.

Allin begun using hemp and lime as a natural construction material in 1997 which led him to write and published Building with Hemp in 2005, the first published book on using hemp as a building system. He has contributed to The Green Building Bible and Local Sustainable Homes and has written articles for magazines Self-Build, Cannabis Culture, Construct Ireland, Energy Blitz, Hanf and New Observations Magazine. He founded the International Hemp Building Association in 2009, after hosting a symposium on the subject in Kenmare, Ireland.

He advocates the use of hemp as a construction material for its ecological production and low carbon footprint both as a material and the subsequent use, energy wise of the structure in a sustainable way and has stated.

Allin introduced hemp building to the US after holding a course in Prescott, Wisconsin in 2012. In 2013 he introduced the system to Finland when he held a course in Turku and then in Sweden in Kristianstad. He also introduced hemp building to Nepal in 2015, demonstrating the system for part of a hospital in Janakpur and again in 2017 to Costa Rica, teaching a workshop in Flamingo, Guanacaste. He is currently involved in projects to rebuild with hemp in the post-earthquake areas of Haiti and Nepal and is a senior adviser at HempToday magazine.

Books
 Allin, Steve (2005). Building with Hemp. SeedPress. .
 Allin, Steve (2012). Building with Hemp 2nd Edition. SeedPress. .
 Allin, Steve (2016). Hemp Can't Save The Planet BUT It Might Save Humanity! .

Contributor

 Hall, Keith. (2006). The Green Building Bible, Volume 1 [Paperback] Green Building Press. .
 Bird, Chris. (2010). Local Sustainable Homes. Transition Books. .
 Allin, Steve; Anthony Cohu (2016). Hemp Building Best Practice Guide. .

See also

 Bringing it Home the Movie

References

External links
 Hempbuilding.com
 International Hemp Building Association

Hemp
Living people
British writers
British environmentalists
1955 births